Aaron Glacier is a  long Antarctic glacier which drains between the Janulis Spur and the Gray Spur in the Thiel Mountains. The name was proposed by Peter Bermel and Arthur B. Ford, co-leaders of the U.S. Geological Survey (USGS) Thiel Mountains party from 1960 to 1961. It was named for John M. Aaron, a USGS geologist and member of the 1960–61 and 1961–62 field parties to the Thiel Mountains.

See also
 List of glaciers in the Antarctic
 Glaciology

References

 

Glaciers of Ellsworth Land